William Roger Dean (born 31 August 1944), known as Roger Dean, is an English artist, designer, and publisher. He began painting posters and album covers for musicians in the late 1960s. The groups for whom he did the most art are the English rock bands Yes and Asia.

The covers often feature exotic fantasy landscapes. His work has sold more than 150 million copies worldwide.

Early life 
William Roger Dean was born on 31 August 1944 in Ashford, Kent. His mother studied dress design at Canterbury School of Art before her marriage and his father was an engineer in the British Army. He has three siblings, brother Martyn and sisters Penny and Philippa. Much of Dean's childhood was spent in Greece, Cyprus, and, from age 12 to 15, Hong Kong, so his father could carry out army duties. Dean was very keen on natural history as a child, and Chinese landscape art and feng shui became particular influences on him during his time in Hong Kong. He has cited landscape, "and the pathways through it", as his greatest influence and source of inspiration.

In 1959, after the family had returned to England, Dean attended Ashford Grammar School followed by his entry in 1961 to the Canterbury College of Art studying silversmithing and furniture design and graduated with a National Diploma in Design. He was removed from a life drawing class by the principal for being "young and impressionable", and was informed he could not take it due to maths and physics being his other subjects, leading a switch to studying industrial design. As the school was trying to become accredited in the subject, Dean bypassed its foundation level course but disliked the way the subject was taught and questioned the teachers as to why people had to live in "boxes" and their response in that "form follows function".

Towards the end of the course at Canterbury, Dean was faced with the option of pursuing either architecture or industrial design; one of his tutors thought neither were for him, and recommended that Dean study at the Royal College of Art in London. He enrolled at the college in 1965 to study furniture design and became a student of Professor David Pye. Among his research was the "psychology of architecture" and what made people feel comfortable in buildings. He did a thesis about "producing a sense of tranquillity in domestic architecture". He graduated from the college in 1968 with a masters first degree honours, and won a silver medal for "work of special distinction". By this time, Dean was interested in "designing the future [...] boxes for people to live in". He considered Rick Griffin's artwork for Aoxomoxoa (1969) by The Grateful Dead as his "first big visual shock" and bought the album prior to owning a record player.

Career

1960s 
Among Dean's first successes was his sea urchin chair design which spawned from his research at the Royal College and completed in 1967. He filed a patent for it in the following year. It has been considered to be a predecessor to the bean bag, whereby the chair compresses and fully adapts to the shape and size of the user. The design was completed when Dean was one of the few students picked from the Royal College to design and make objects in famed designer Cherrill Scheer's factory. The chair remains one of Cherrill's favourite pieces. It is now a part of the permanent collection at the Victoria and Albert Museum.

In 1968, during his third year at the Royal College, Dean was assigned a project which involved the design of a contemporary landscape seating area of the upstairs disco at Ronnie Scott's Jazz Club in Soho. This led to the design of his first album cover, Gun (1968) by rock band Gun, after owner Ronnie Scott asked him to adapt a demonic-themed design that Dean originally made in his sketchbook for his thesis, for the album's cover. Dean agreed, and was paid "around £5,000" for his work. Dean earned more money from the album's cover than he had done with architecture related work, and realised covers took much less effort. He decided to venture into cover design not purely for the money, but its wider audience and its use "as a propaganda tool [...] showing people what might be and what could be". Dean began to pick up work where he could, including covers for various jazz artists for Vertigo Records which he disliked, calling them "austere exercises" and too restrictive for the ideas he wished to convey. The experience led Dean to establish a commission before starting work he wanted to do, leading to a short period of financial hardship. At the same time, he wanted to release a book on architecture but faced rejection from 27 different publishers.

1970s 
Dean designed the logo to the independent label Fly Records in 1970. This led to Dean working on a single for their musician Marc Bolan which involved typesetting the liner notes and lyrics, but Dean had not done the technique before and completed them by hand with the assistance of a graphic designer, in order to show the printing staff where the typesets were to be placed. The positive reaction Dean received from his style of writing led to him handwriting the text for further Bolan singles. This was a similar case for Dean's design for Clear Blue Sky (1970) by Clear Blue Sky, where a painting had been completed except the typesetting, "So to bluff my way through the meeting I had to handwrite it all and hope they would never ask about it". The label's staffers were enthusiastic, which gave Dean the confidence to pursue more handwriting, logo, and graphic work.

By 1971, Dean's desire to produce artwork for rock bands had grown though he continued to pursue architecture and headed a small exhibition of his work in Florence. Following discussions with A&R man David Howells, who had assigned Dean the sleeve for The Gun, Dean agreed to work on the cover of Osibisa (1971) by afrobeat band Osibisa. The design is a result of a brief that Dean described as "credible African fairytale imagery" and features "flying elephants and not architecture", which became an early representation of the style he later achieved fame with. Dean considered the job a breakthrough for his career as the design was made into a poster by the Big 'O' poster company which sold a large number of copies. He later said, "From that point on I could do what I wanted".

In mid-1971, during his search for work affiliated with rock bands, Dean sent a portfolio to numerous executives including Phil Carson, the European General Manager of Atlantic Records. Carson took an interest in using Dean for one of his rock acts, Yes, and hired Dean for the cover of Yes's fourth album, Fragile (1971), which marked the beginning of an association with the band to the present day. Dean pitched a story on a creation myth rather than a particular image for it, "about a child who dreamt they were living on a planet that was breaking up, so they had to build a space ark to find another planet to live on. And they towed all the little bits of the planet with them". In 1972, he designed the band's logo while travelling on the Brighton Belle train, which has been used on most of their albums since Close to the Edge (1972). In addition to their covers, Dean and his brother Martyn worked on the stage design for Yes from 1973 to 1976, 1980, 1989, and 2004. The tour for Tales from Topographic Oceans (1973) featured a nationwide merchandising campaign including posters and t-shirts that led to the creation of Brockum.

In 1972, Dean designed the logo for the newly established Virgin Records. While working on the art for Yessongs (1973), Dean and his printers Tinsley Robor secured a patent for "a way of going from gatefold to any number of pages, folded out of one piece of card". In the late 1970s, Dean had an idea for Living in the Third Millennium, a thirteen episode television show about the designs and technological challenges of the future, yet it never made it to production due to budget constraints.

1980s–present 
In the 1980s, Dean's output focused on other areas, including stage design, architecture, and video game art. In 1981, he collaborated with his brother Martyn on the Tectonic House, an environmentally-friendly and economic home built to last that was displayed at the annual International Ideal Home Exhibition in Birmingham. The idea spawned from two ideas: Dean's earlier designs for a bed and bedroom intended for the safety of children, and Martyn's "retreat pod" from 1970 that was featured in the Stanley Kubrick film A Clockwork Orange (1971). The project has developed into its current name, Home for Life, and the non-working prototype contains no straight edges or right angles. In the early 2000s, the cost to produce one was estimated to be $72,000–$80,000. Although several local British governments have expressed interest in the project, none have come into fruition. In 2003, a project involving the construction of 264 villas, chalets, and apartments designed by Dean on a 65-acre site near Stourport-on-Severn, Worcestershire had entered the planning stage.

In 1982, readers of Rolling Stone voted Dean's cover for Asia's debut studio album was voted the second greatest album cover of all time, behind Sgt. Pepper's Lonely Hearts Club Band (1967) by The Beatles.

Dean's first design for a video game was The Black Onyx (1984), which was a collaboration with comic artist Michael Kaluta. It marked the beginning of a series of designs Dean produced for Henk Rogers, who designed the game. The project involved Dean and Kaluta producing an estimated 4,000 drawings for the game, including ideas for its animation, story, music, and motion capture. Dean went on to produce the cover artwork for several Psygnosis games, including Obliterator (1988) and Shadow of the Beast (1989). Dean redesigned the Tetris logo which led to the design of the cover art for Tetris Worlds (2001).

Dean received an honorary doctorate from the Academy of Art University in San Francisco in 2002, and an honorary fellowship from the Arts University Bournemouth in 2009.

In 2013, Dean filed a legal action in U.S. District Court New York claiming that film director James Cameron had plagiarized 14 of his original images in the making the 2009 blockbuster film Avatar.  Dean sought damages of $50M. Although the filmmakers admitted in court to being influenced by the artist's work, Dean's case was dismissed in 2014.

In 2013, Dean received a Gold Badge of Merit from the British Academy of Songwriters, Composers and Authors.

In March 2021, Dean released his first artwork on the digital art auction platform Nifty Gateway, featuring non-fungible token art pieces.

Dean has two permanent galleries, his largest at Trading Boundaries, East Sussex in the UK and the other at The San Francisco Art Exchange. Both galleries display original works and limited edition prints, sketches and drawings.

Album covers

Known primarily for the dreamy, other-worldly scenes he has created for Yes, Asia, Budgie, Uriah Heep, Gentle Giant and other bands, Dean has described himself primarily as a landscape painter. Characteristic landscapes show graceful stone arches (as shown in Arches Mist) or floating islands, while many paintings portray organic-seeming habitats, such as on the cover of Anderson Bruford Wakeman Howe. Though he primarily works with watercolour paints, many of his paintings make use of multiple media, including gouache, ink, enamel, crayon and collage. In addition to his cover paintings, Dean is respected for his calligraphic work, designing logos and titles to go with his paintings.

Dean was friends with album cover designer Storm Thorgerson of Hipgnosis and the two lived in the same building after leaving university. He recalled a time when they collaborated on an album cover, but it turned out to be "a complete failure".
The rise of the compact disc in the 1980s led to what Dean described as a decline in combining music with art, with the jewel case looking "tacky" and a way for record companies sacrificing quality to save money. He cites the early CD reissue of Close to the Edge by Yes as one that particularly affected him as his inner sleeve artwork was missing, replaced with black and white text.

Personal life 
Dean has a daughter, artist and designer Freyja Dean (b. 1987) who is the inspiration behind the title to Dean's painting Freyja's Castle (1987). Dean lives in Lewes, East Sussex.

Recognition in other media  
Dean is mentioned in the 1987 song "Dickie Davies Eyes" by English band Half Man Half Biscuit.

On 19 August 2016, the Isle of Man Post Office issued a series of 6 stamps featuring Dean's artwork:
 "Meeting Place" - produced exclusively for the stamp issue
 "Blind Owl Late Landing" - features the unreleased Blind Owl album artwork
 "Pathways" - cover artwork from Yes triple album Yessongs
 "Green Parrot Island" - derived from The Studio Albums 1969-1987 box set by Yes
 "Tales from Topographic Oceans" - from the Yes album of the same name
 "Sea of Light" comes from the Uriah Heep album of the same name

Dean has had a long relationship with the Isle of Man, and especially with its long-term resident Rick Wakeman, keyboardist of the progressive rock band 'Yes', for which Dean has designed several pieces of album artwork.

The First Day Cover (FDC) was also issued in a limited 750-issue run which were signed by Roger Dean (this cover was issued on 2 September 2016).

On 20 August 2016, an exhibition of Dean's masterpieces went on display at the Manx Museum.

A special FDC was issued on 25 March 2018, to celebrate 50 years of 'Yes' - this was a different cover to the August 2016 one, and was postmarked in Gold to record this historic event and signed personally by Dean who has created a special 50th Anniversary logo. A limited edition of 1000 signed covers were issued.

Covers

Albums

Video games 

 The Black Onyx (1984)
 Brataccas (1986)
 Super Black Onyx (1987) 
 Barbarian (1987)
 Terrorpods (1987)
 Chrono Quest (1988)
 Obliterator (1988)
 Shadow of the Beast (1989)
 Stryx (1989)
 Shadow of the Beast II (1990)
 Amnios (1991)
 Fatal Rewind (1991)
 Shadow of the Beast III (1992)
 Agony (1992)
 Faceball 2000 (1992; in-game background art only)
 Tetris Worlds (2001)
 Tetris Splash (2007)

Publications

Books of Roger Dean art

Books edited by Roger Dean
 The Flights of Icarus (1977) by Donald Lehmkuhl. Edited by Roger & Martyn Dean. Large format colour book with paintings by Alan Lee, Patrick Woodroffe, Jeffrey Jones, Ian Miller, Bernie Wrightson, Melvyn Grant, Peter Jones, Syd Mead, Barry Windsor-Smith, Michael Kaluta, Roger Dean, Jim Fitzpatrick, Bruce Pennington, Chris Foss, and others

Album Cover Album: The Book of Record Jackets (1977; with Storm Thorgerson, Dominy Hamilton)
Album Cover Album Vol. 2: The Second Volume: The 2nd Book of Record Sleeves (1982; with David Howells)
Album Cover Album Vol. 3: The 3rd Book of Record Sleeves (1986; with David Howells)
Album Cover Album Vol. 4: Ultimate Album Cover Album (1987; with David Howells)
Album Cover Album Vol. 5: The 5th Book of Record Jackets (1989; with Storm Thorgerson)
Album Cover Album Vol. 6: The 6th Book of Record Jackets (1992; with  Vaughn Oliver, Storm Thorgerson)
The Album Cover Album (2008; reissue of 1977 book with additional prefaces, forewords, etc, by Storm Thorgerson, Peter Gabriel, John Wetton)

References

Bibliography

External links
 Roger Dean website

1944 births
Living people
English illustrators
British speculative fiction artists
Fantasy artists
Alumni of the University for the Creative Arts
People from Ashford, Kent
Alumni of the Royal College of Art
Album-cover and concert-poster artists
World Fantasy Award-winning artists
People educated at The Norton Knatchbull School